Group 3 of the 1978 FIFA World Cup was one of four groups of nations competing at the 1978 FIFA World Cup. The group consisted of Brazil, Austria, Spain and Sweden.

In their first world cup since 1958, Austrian players retrieved a part of their past glory. They won the group before an astonished Brazil. "Auriverdes" who scored only two goals were thrilling until the end of the third game. An Austrian equalizer could send Spain to the next round.

Finally, Brazilians clinched the second place to reach the second round where they had to play against the Argentinians hosts and Peruvians in a "Latin American coloured group".

Standings

Matches

Austria vs Spain

Brazil vs Sweden
This match is remembered for Zico's disallowed goal during injury time of the second half. Welsh referee Clive Thomas whistled for full time while the ball was in the air after a corner kick, fractions of second before Zico's header. .

Austria vs Sweden

{| width="100%"
|valign="top" width="50%"|

Brazil vs Spain

Spain vs Sweden

Brazil vs Austria

References

External sources
 Report of the game Austria-Spain
 Report of the game Brazil-Sweden
 Report of the game Brazil-Sweden
 Report of the game Austria-Sweden
 Report of the game Brazil-Spain
 Report of the game Brazil-Spain
 Report of the game Spain-Sweden
 Report of the game Spain-Sweden
 Report of the game Brazil-Austria

Groups
Austria at the 1978 FIFA World Cup
Brazil at the 1978 FIFA World Cup
Spain at the 1978 FIFA World Cup
Sweden at the 1978 FIFA World Cup